Anacrusis subruptimacula is a species of moth of the family Tortricidae. It is found in Ecuador in the provinces of Carchi and Napo.

The wingspan is about 30 mm. The ground colour of the forewings is whitish cream, whitish costally and suffused brown dorsally and postmedially. The hindwings are cream tinged brownish and brownish on the peripheries.

References

Moths described in 2011
Atteriini
Moths of South America
Taxa named by Józef Razowski